Minh Alva Vu, commonly known as Minh Vu, (born September 27, 1990) is an American soccer player for National Soccer League US side Deportivo La Real FC.

Career

College and amateur
Vu played fours years of college soccer - two at Pima Community College between 2009 and 2010 and two at Penn State University between 2011 and 2012.

Professional
Vu signed his first professional deal with USL Pro club Rochester Rhinos on February 13, 2014.

Personal life
Vu's father is Vietnamese and his mother is Spanish. It was reported that Vu will attempt to obtain Vietnamese citizenship in order to play for V-League club SHB Đà Nẵng in the future.

See also
 List of Vietnam footballers born outside Vietnam

References

1990 births
Living people
American soccer players
Penn State Nittany Lions men's soccer players
Rochester New York FC players
FC Tucson players
Phoenix Rising FC players
USL Championship players
Soccer players from Tucson, Arizona
American sportspeople of Vietnamese descent
American people of Spanish descent
Association football midfielders
Association football forwards